APUC may refer to:

 Advanced Procurement for Universities and Colleges, the Scottish universities' procurement consortium
 Acharya Pre University College, Bengaluru, India
 Asia-Pacific Unicycle Competition
 Association for the Promotion of the Unity of Christendom